12th Anti-Aircraft Division (12th AA Division) was an air defence formation of the British Army during the early years of the Second World War. It defended Western Scotland and Northern Ireland, including the period of the Clydebank Blitz and Belfast Blitz, but only had a short career.

Mobilisation
The 12th Anti-Aircraft Division was one of five new divisions created on 1 November 1940 by Anti-Aircraft Command to control the expanding anti-aircraft (AA) defences of the United Kingdom. The  division was formed by separating responsibility for Western Scotland (particularly the industrial areas of Clydeside and Ayrshire) and Northern Ireland from the existing 3rd AA Division, which continued to be responsible for the rest of mainland Scotland.

The divisional headquarters (HQ) was at Glasgow and the General Officer Commanding (GOC), appointed on 15 November 1940, was Major-General Gerald Rickards, promoted from command of 44th AA Brigade. The 12th AA Division formed part of III AA Corps.

The Blitz

The division's fighting units, organised into three AA Brigades, consisted of Heavy (HAA) and Light (LAA) gun regiments and Searchlight (S/L) regiments of the Royal Artillery (RA). The HAA guns were concentrated in the Gun Defence Areas (GDAs) at Belfast and Glasgow, LAA units were distributed to defend Vulnerable Points (VPs) such as factories and airfields, while the S/L detachments were disposed in clusters of three, spaced 10,400 yards apart.

The approved scale of HAA guns for the Clyde had been 80 in 1939, and this was raised to 120 in 1940 and again to 144 in March 1941, but by the end of February 1941, the 12th AA Division still only had 67 guns in place, rising to 88 (11 batteries) in late March.

Glasgow and Clydeside received heavy raids on the nights of 13 and 14 March 1941 (the Clydebank Blitz), and again on 7 April, while Belfast was hit on 15 April and 4 May. The Luftwaffe returned to Clydeside on 5 and 6 May, before The Blitz petered out in mid-May.

Order of Battle 1940–41

The division's composition during the Blitz was as follows:

 3rd AA Brigade – Northern Ireland District
 102nd HAA Regiment
 66th LAA Rgt – new unit raised December 1940 from LAA batteries of 102nd HAA Rgt 
 90th S/L Rgt – new unit raised March 1941
 91st S/L Rgt – new unit raised March 1941
 42nd AA Brigade – Clyde Estuary
 83rd (Blythswood) HAA Rgt
 100th HAA Rgt
 111th HAA Rgt – new unit raised October 1940
 123rd HAA Rgt – new unit raised February 1941
 18th LAA Rgt
 60th LAA Rgt – new unit raised November 1940;60 LAA Rgt at RA 39–45. to the 63rd AA Brigade by May 1941
 63rd AA Brigade – West Scotland
 60th LAA Rgt – from 42 AA Bde by May 1941
 56th (Cameronians) S/L Rgt – to 3rd AA Division by February 1941
 57th (Cameronians) S/L Rgt
 66th S/L Rgt– to the 8th AA Division by May 1941
 86th S/L Rgt – new unit raised January 1941
 11th AA 'Z' Regiment – divisional Z Battery rocket unit formed January 1941
 12th AA Divisional Signals, Royal Corps of Signals (RCS) – expanded from a Glasgow company of 3rd AA Divisional Signals
 12th Divisional Royal Army Service Corps (RASC)
 195th Company (Northern Ireland District)
 909th Company
 12th AA Divisional Royal Army Medical Corps (RAMC)
 12th AA Divisional Workshop Company, Royal Army Ordnance Corps (RAOC)

Mid-War

Newly formed AA units joined the division, the HAA and support units increasingly becoming 'Mixed' units, indicating that women of the Auxiliary Territorial Service (ATS) were fully integrated into them. At the same time, experienced units were posted away to train for service overseas; in some cases they joined the 12th AA Division temporarily while they trained in Scotland; others remained with AA Command as unbrigaded units. This led to a continual turnover of units, which accelerated in 1942 with the preparations for the invasion of North Africa (Operation Torch) and the need to transfer AA units  to counter the Baedeker raids.

At the end of 1941 S/Ls were declustered to form 'killer zones' for night fighters, and the S/L requirement for Northern Ireland was reduced to three batteries. As a result, 91st S/L Rgt could be converted into an LAA Rgt for the field army.

In May 1942, the 57th AA Brigade HQ was transferred to the 12th AA Division from the 7th AA Division; some units from the 42nd AA Brigade were transferred to it, together with newly formed units. In August, to deal with the Luftwaffes hit-and-run attacks, the 3rd AA Division's HQ was moved from Scotland to the South Coast of England and the 12th AA Division took over command of 51st AA Brigade and its units.

Order of Battle 1941–42
During this period the division was composed as follows (temporary attachments omitted):

 3rd AA Brigade
 1 HAA Rgt from 4th AA Division July 1941
 102nd HAA Rgt – to 6th AA Division by October 1942
 111th HAA Rgt – from 42 AA Bde June 1941 
 66th LAA Rgt – to 6th AA Division June 1942
81st LAA Rgt – from 42 AA Bde by October 1942
 84th LAA Rgt – from 63 AA Bde June 1942; to 9th AA Division by October 1942
 90th S/L Rgt
 91st S/L Rgt – converted into 114th LAA Rgt January 1942; then to 4th AA Division
 42nd AA Brigade
 59th (Essex Regiment) HAA Rgt – from 6th AA Division Summer 1941; returned by December 1941
 60th (City of London) HAA Rgt – from  11th AA Division by December 1941; to 57 AA Bde May 1942
 73rd HAA Rgt – from 7th AA Division May 1941; to War Office (WO) Reserve September 1941; later to Middle East Forces (MEF)
 83rd (Blythswood) HAA Rgt – to WO Reserve June 1941; later to Tenth Army in Iraq
 100th HAA Rgt – to 57 AA Bde May 1942
 111th HAA Rgt – to 3 AA Bde June 1941
 123rd HAA Rgt – to 7th AA Division by December 1941
 126th HAA Rgt – new unit raised July 1941; to 9th AA Division September 1942
 130th (Mixed) HAA Rgt – new unit raised August 1941
 147th HAA Rgt– from 51 AA Bde September 1942
 155th (Mixed) HAA Rgt – from 57 AA Bde August 1942; unbrigaded unit September 1942
 170th (Mixed) HAA Rgt – new unit raised August 1942
 18th LAA Rgt – to 63 AA Bde Summer 1941
 81st LAA Rgt – from 5th AA Division May 1942; to 3 AA Bde by October 1942
 3rd AA 'Z' Regiment – from 3rd AA Division Summer 1941; rejoined 3rd AA Division May 1942
 11th AA 'Z' Regiment – from 63 AA Bde Summer 1941
 51 AA Brigade – joined August 1942 100th HAA Rgt – from 57 AA Bde June 1942; unbrigaded unit September 1942
 113th HAA Rgt
 114th HAA Rgt
 147th HAA Rgt – to 42 AA Bde September 1942
 130th (Queen's Edinburgh, Royal Scots) LAA Rgt130 LAA Rgt at RA 39–45.
 131st LAA Rgt
 57th AA Brigade – joined May 1942
 60th (City of London) HAA – from 42 AA Bde May 1942; unbrigaded unit June 1942
 100th HAA Rgt – from 42 AA Bde May 1942; to 51 AA Bde June 1942
 134th (Mixed) HAA Rgt– from 11th AA Division August 1942; returned by October 1942
 155th (Mixed) HAA Rgt – new unit raised March 1942; to 42 AA Bde August 1942
 4 AA 'Z' Rgt – from 4th AA Division August 1942
 63 AA Brigade'''
 17th LAA Rgt17 LAA Rgt at RA 39–45. – from 6th AA Division by December 1941; left AA Command June 1942; later to Operation TorchRoutledge, p. 178.
 18th LAA Rgt – from 42 AA Bde Summer 1941; to Tenth Army in Iraq March 1942 57th (Glasgow) LAA Rgt
 60th LAA Rgt – to 5th AA Division by December 1941 84th LAA Rgt – new unit raised August 1941; joined December 1941; to 3 AA Bde June 1942 135th LAA Rgt – from 3rd AA Division June 1942; left July 1942 86th S/L Rgt – converted into 120th LAA Rgt January 1942; to 2nd AA Division September 1942 11th AA 'Z' Regiment – to 42 AA Bde Summer 1941The increased sophistication of Operations Rooms and communications was reflected in the growth in support units, which attained the following organisation by May 1942:
 12th AA Division Mixed Signal Unit HQ, RCS
 HQ No 1 Company
 12th AA Division Mixed Signal Office Section
 404th AA Gun Operations Room Mixed Signal Section (Glasgow & Clyde)
 9th AA Sub-Gun Operations Room Mixed Signal Sub-Section
 10th AA Sub-Gun Operations Room Mixed Signal Sub-Section
 11th AA Sub-Gun Operations Room Mixed Signal Sub-Section
 12th AA Sub-Gun Operations Room Mixed Signal Sub-Section
 13th AA Sub-Gun Operations Room Mixed Signal Sub-Section
 14th AA Sub-Gun Operations Room Mixed Signal Sub-Section
 42nd AA Brigade Signal Office Mixed Sub-Section
 335th AA Gun Operations Room Mixed Signal Section (Inverkip)
 57th AA Brigade Signal Office Mixed Sub-Section
 63rd AA Brigade Signal Office Mixed Sub-Section
 206th RAF Fighter Sector Sub-Section (RAF Ayr)
 326th AA Gun Operations Room Mixed Signal Section (Ardeer)
 327th AA Gun Operations Room Mixed Signal Section (Stranraer)
 30th AA Line Maintenance Section
 HQ No 2 Company (Northern Ireland District)
 410th AA Gun Operations Room Mixed Signal Section (Northern Ireland District)
 30th AA Sub-Gun Operations Room Mixed Signal Sub-Section
 31st AA Sub-Gun Operations Room Mixed Signal Sub-Section
 3rd AA Brigade Signal Office Mixed Sub-Section
 207th RAF Fighter Sector Sub-Section (RAF Ballyhalbert)
 337th AA Gun Operations Room Mixed Signal Section (Londonderry)
 208th RAF Fighter Sector Sub-Section (RAF Eglinton)
 209th RAF Fighter Sector Sub-Section (RAF St Angelo)
 31st AA Line Maintenance Section
 32nd AA Line Maintenance Section
 HQ 12th AA Division RASC
 36th Company
 195th Company (Northern Ireland District)
 909th Company
 12th AA Div RAMC
 12th AA Div Workshop Company, RAOC
 12th AA Div Radio Maintenance Company, RAOC

The RAOC companies became part of the new Royal Electrical and Mechanical Engineers (REME) during 1942.

Disbandment
A reorganisation of AA Command in October 1942 saw the AA divisions disbanded and replaced by a smaller number of AA Groups more closely aligned with the groups of RAF Fighter Command. The 12th AA Division amalgamated with the 3rd and the 7th AA Divisions to form the 6th AA Group, based at Edinburgh and cooperating with No. 14 Group RAF, while Northern Ireland became the 7th AA Group based at Belfast and working with No. 9 Group RAF.Routledge, Map 36. Major-General Rickards retired. The 12th AA Divisional Signals was amalgamated back into its parent 3rd AA Divisional Signals as the 6th AA Group (Mixed) Signals.

General Officer Commanding
The following officer commanded 12th AA Division:
 Major-General Gerald Rickards (15 November 1940 – 30 September 1942)

Notes

References

 Basil Collier, History of the Second World War, United Kingdom Military Series: The Defence of the United Kingdom, London: HM Stationery Office, 1957.
 Gen Sir Martin Farndale, History of the Royal Regiment of Artillery: The Years of Defeat: Europe and North Africa, 1939–1941, Woolwich: Royal Artillery Institution, 1988/London: Brasseys, 1996, .
 J.B.M. Frederick, Lineage Book of British Land Forces 1660–1978, Vol II, Wakefield, Microform Academic, 1984, .
 
 Norman E.H. Litchfield, The Territorial Artillery 1908–1988 (Their Lineage, Uniforms and Badges), Nottingham: Sherwood Press, 1992, .
 Cliff Lord & Graham Watson, Royal Corps of Signals: Unit Histories of the Corps (1920–2001) and its Antecedents, Solihull: Helion, 2003, .
 Maj-Gen R.F.H. Nalder, The Royal Corps of Signals: A History of its Antecedents and Developments (Circa 1800–1955), London: Royal Signals Institution, 1958.
 Sir Frederick Pile's despatch: "The Anti-Aircraft Defence of the United Kingdom from 28th July, 1939, to 15th April, 1945" London Gazette 18 December 1947.
 Brig N.W. Routledge, History of the Royal Regiment of Artillery: Anti-Aircraft Artillery 1914–55'', London: Royal Artillery Institution/Brassey's, 1994, .

External sources
 British Military History
 Generals of World War II
 Royal Artillery 1939–1945

Military units and formations established in 1940
12
Military units and formations disestablished in 1942
12